The Msygkhua church is a ruined medieval church at the village of  (Phsygkhva) in Abkhazia, an entity in the South Caucasus with a disputed political status. It is located on the eponymous hill in the Tskuara river valley, immediately west of the town of New Athos, at the Black Sea coastline.

History 
In 1962, the remains of an old cult building were found on Msigkhva Mountain.
The ruins were excavated and dated to the 10th century by Anatoly Katsia in the 1960s. It is a small edifice, with the dimensions of 9.8 x 7.6 m. The walls survive to the height of 1.6 m. The church is set in a Middle Byzantine cross-in-square design, with the dome resting on four cruciform columns and three protruding apses, of which the central one was pentahedral on the exterior and horseshoe-shaped on the interior, while the side apses were semi-circular in shape. Liturgical items such as three tables in the center of each apse and parts of the altar screen have survived. Among the fragments of the tiles part of an antefix with a "Maltese cross" and Georgian inscriptions was discovered, which make it clear that the church was built in the name of Archangel Michael. It is one of the earliest specimens of Georgian script found in Abkhazia and western Georgia in general.

References

External links
Msigkhva Mountain church Historical monuments of Abkhazia — Government of the Autonomous Republic of Abkhazia.

Churches in Abkhazia